The Sultanate of Hobyo, also known as the Sultanate of Obbia, was a 19th-century Somali kingdom in present-day northeastern and central Somalia and eastern Ethiopia. It was established in 1864 by Yusuf Ali Kenadid ,  ruler by hiraab imatate

Administration
As with the Majeerteen Sultanate, the Sultanate of Hobyo exerted a strong centralised authority during its existence and possessed all of the organs and trappings of an integrated modern state: a functioning bureaucracy, a hereditary nobility, titled aristocrats, a state flag as well as a professional army. Like the Majeerteen Sultanate, it was another example of the determination of the Migiurtini people to maintain a traditional and free society. Both sultanates also maintained written records of their activities, which still exist.

History

Rise of the Sultanate
The sultanate of Hobyo originated from a rift within the Majeerteen. The election of Yusuf Ali as Sultan by Bah Lelkase and Bah Yaqub in Alula(which from the time of Boqor Xawaadane had been designated as the residence of the Bah Yaqubs) was the origin of a dynastic conflict.
 
Initially, Ali Yusuf Kenadid's goal was to seize control of the neighbouring Majeerteen Sultanate, which was then ruled by his cousin Boqor Osman Mahamud. However, he was unsuccessful in this endeavour, and was eventually forced into exile in Yemen. A decade later, in the 1870s, Kenadid returned from the Arabian Peninsula with a band of Hadhrami musketeers and a group of devoted lieutenants. With their assistance, he managed to overpower the local Hawiye clans and establish the kingdom of Hobyo in 1878.
 
 In the late 19th century, all extant Somali monarchs entered into treaties with one of the colonial powers, Abyssinia, Britain or Italy, In late 1888, Sultan Kenadid entered into a treaty with the Italians, making his realm an Italian protectorate. His rival Boqor Osman would sign a similar agreement vis-a-vis his own Sultanate the following year. Both rulers had signed the protectorate treaties to advance their own expansionist objectives, with Kenadid looking to use Italy's support in his dispute with the Omani Sultan of Zanzibar over an area bordering Warsheikh, in addition to his ongoing power struggle over the Majeerteen Sultanate with Boqor Osman. In signing the agreements, the rulers also hoped to exploit the rival objectives of the European imperial powers so as to more effectively assure the continued independence of their territories.
 
The terms of each treaty specified that Italy was to steer clear of any interference in the sultanates' respective administrations. In return for Italian arms and an annual subsidy, the Sultans conceded to a minimum of oversight and economic concessions. The Italians also agreed to dispatch a few ambassadors to promote both the sultanates' and their own interests.
 
However, the relationship between Hobyo and Italy soured when Sultan Kenadid refused the Italians' proposal to allow a British contingent of troops to disembark in his Sultanate so that they might then pursue their battle against the emir of Diiriye Guure, Mohammed Abdullah Hassan and their Dervish forces. Viewed as too much of a threat by the Italians, Sultan Kenadid was eventually exiled to Aden in Yemen and then to Eritrea, as was his son Ali Yusuf, the heir apparent to his throne. However, unlike the southern territories, the northern sultanates were not subject to direct rule due to the earlier treaties they had signed with the Italians.

Omar Samatar's Rebellion 
Though victorious against the sultan's forces, the populace had yet to accept Italian rule without a fight. Commissioner Trivulzio, assigned with administering Hobyo, reported the movement of armed men towards the borders of the sultanate before and after the annexation. As preparations were underway to continue the Corpo Zaptié's advance into Majeerteen, a new threat emerged. One of Sultan Ali Yusuf's commanders, Omar Samatar, attacked and captured El Buur on 9 November 1925. The local populace sided with Omar, and soon enough the Italians had a full-scale revolution on their hands after Omar followed up his previous success with the capture of El-Dhere. The Corpo Zaptié tried and failed to recapture El-Bur from Omar. By 15 November the Italians had fled to Bud Bud, ambushed by partisans the whole way and rather diminished in forces and resolve.

A third attempt was planned, but before it could be executed the commander of the operation, Lieutenant-Colonel Splendorelli, was ambushed and killed between Bud Bud and Bula Barde. Italian morale hit rock bottom, and Hobyo seemed a lost cause as Omar stood poised to reconquer Hobyo itself. In an attempt to salvage the situation, governor De Vecchi requested two battalions from Eritrea and assumed personal command. The rebellion soon spilled over the borders into the Benadir and Western Somaliland, and Omar grew increasingly powerful.

The disaster in Hobyo shocked Italian policymakers in Rome. Blame soon fell on Governor De Vecchi, whose perceived incompetence was blamed for Omar's rise. Rome instructed De Vecchi that he was to receive the reinforcement from Eritrea, but that the commander of the Eritrean battalions was to assume the military command and De Vecchi was confined to Mogadishu and limited to an administrative role. The commander was to report directly to Rome, bypassing De Vecchi entirely.

As the situation was extremely confused, De Vecchi took former Sultan Ali Yusuf with him to Mogadishu. Mussolini vowed to reconquer all of Hobyo and move on to Majertin by any means necessary. Even reinstating Ali Yusuf was considered. However, the clans had already sided with Omar Samatar, so this was not as viable an option as it would appear.

Before the reinforcements arrived, De Vecchi chose the age old tactic of divide and rule, and offered great rewards, money and prestige to any clans who chose to support the Italians. Considering the eons-old clan rivalries which have been the bane of Somali states from time immemorial, it is a wonder this strategy hadn't been attempted sooner, and turned out to be far more successful than the Eritrean regiments in reversing the rebellion.

With the steam taken out of the rebellion, and the military forces heavily reinforced with the battalions from Eritrea, the Italians retook El-Buur on December 26, 1925, and compelled Omar Samatar to retreat into Western Somaliland.

The Cumar-Samatar Secondary School in central Galkacyo is named after Omar Samatar in remembrance of his struggles and sacrifices.

See also
Yasin Osman Kenadid
Yusuf Ali Kenadid
Boqor Osman Mahmud
Osmanya script
List of Sunni Muslim dynasties

References

Notes 
 
 
 
 The Majeerteen Sultanates
 Emblem & Flag

External links
The Majeerteen Sultanates

Modern history of Somalia
Hobyo
Somali empires
Former countries